Motspur Park railway station is a suburban station in the London Borough of Merton in south London. The station is served by South Western Railway, and is in Travelcard Zone 4.

Southbound destinations are Chessington South, Dorking and Guildford.

The station stands atop a railway embankment off a service road behind the parade of shops on West Barnes Lane. The shops and surrounding streets on both sides of the line are known as Motspur Park. There is also footpath access from Claremont Avenue on the western side.

The station is a single island platform reached by footbridge from either side of the track. The station retains its original Southern Railway buildings in the centre of the platform.

History 

The railway itself was constructed through the locality in 1859 but the Motspur Park station was not added until 1925.

In foggy conditions, a train was incorrectly authorized by a fogsignalman to pass a danger signal, and collided with another train that was crossing the line in front of it.

A small newspaper kiosk once stood on the West Barnes Lane side of the approach road, Station Road, opposite the Earl Beatty public house, but this was demolished in the 1970s and has been replaced by a prefabricated travel agency office that later became a minicab office.

The earlier manually operated gates were operated by a wheel turned by the signalman from within the box.

Services

Current Services
All services at Motspur Park are operated by South Western Railway using  EMUs.

Until 2022, Class 456 trains were often attached to Class 455 units to form ten carriage trains, but these were withdrawn on 17 January with the introduction of a new timetable.

The typical off-peak service in trains per hour is:
 4 tph to  via 
 2 tph to 
 1 tph to 
 1 tph to

Future Services
Under Transport for London's plans for Crossrail 2, Motspur Park was originally chosen as a hub station to serve Malden Manor, Tolworth and Chessington North on the Chessington Branch Line as well as Worcester Park, Stoneleigh and Ewell West on the Mole Valley Line. Crossrail trains were not planned to stop at those stations so as to provide fast suburban links to a wide variety of railway stations including Victoria and Kings Cross St Pancras. In October 2015, TfL announced a set of local consultations would take place and their amended proposal provides that Crossrail 2 trains will now stop at all stations on the routes to the south and west of Wimbledon. Construction of the line is currently on hold due to a lack of available funding.

Connections
London Buses route K5 serves the station.

References

External links

Railway stations in the London Borough of Merton
Former Southern Railway (UK) stations
Railway stations in Great Britain opened in 1925
Railway stations served by South Western Railway